Snowball seed oil is a pressed seed oil, extracted from the seeds of the Viburnum opulus (common snowball), which grows in Russia. Snowball bark contains a variety of bioactive substances, including tannic substances, saponins, vitamin K1, ascorbic acid and carotene, and is used medicinally. The seeds, which contain up to 21% oil, are rich in tocopherol (Vitamin E), carotinoides (provitamin A) and micronutrients. Snowball seed oil is little known or used outside Russia.

References 

Vegetable oils